The 2nd Marine Aircraft Wing Band is a United States Marine Corps Air-Ground Task Force regional military band located at Marine Corps Air Station Cherry Point. It performs at basic state functions, civilian ceremonies, and military parades in the region, presenting musical support and entertainment for unit/community events.

History
The band was founded shortly after the aircraft wing was founded in July 1941. It took part in the opening of New Bern's Tryon Palace in April 1959. In 2007, the 2nd MAW Band was deployed to Iraq to support Multi-National Forces West by providing security at a tactical air control center for the remainder of the Iraq War. In 2013, the band took part in the Macy's Thanksgiving Day Parade as part of the East Coast Marine Corps Composite Band.

Honors
The band had Certificates of Commendation from the Commandant of the Marine Corps (Generals Robert E. Cushman Jr. in 1973 and Paul X. Kelley in 1985) given to them. Additionally, the band received Meritorious Unit Citations in 1972 and 1984 for excellence in the performance of duty.

Ensembles and events

The 51 members of the band are organized a range of unit ensembles:

Marching Band
Concert Band
Jazz Band
Big Band
Show Band
Jazz Combo
Brass Quintet
Woodwind Quintet
Woodwind Duo

All 9 of these ensembles play am important part in public relations for the band and the 2nd MAW Wing, traveling extensively throughout the eastern United States. It has made appearances many events such as the following:

Cotton Bowl
Kentucky Derby
Indy 500
Miss America Pageant Parade
Mardi Gras Parades
International Marine Tattoo (Rochester, New York)
Fortissimo Sunset Ceremony (Ottawa, Canada)
Memorial Day Parade (Dearborn, MI)
Columbus Day Parade
4th of July concert (New Bern, North Carolina)

During one of their international visits, the band had the rare honor of performing for the Margrethe II of Denmark and Prince Edward, Earl of Wessex.

Gallery

Sources

External links

Video: United States Marine Corps band perform the national anthem on Patriots' Day

Bands of the United States Marine Corps
Wind bands
Musical groups established in 1941